Baltzar von Platen may refer to:

Baltzar von Platen (1766–1829), Swedish naval officer and statesman
Baltzar von Platen (1804–1875), Swedish noble and naval officer
Baltzar von Platen (inventor) (1898–1984), Swedish inventor